VH-5 (Rescue Squadron 5) was one of six dedicated (VH) Rescue Squadrons of the U.S. Navy during WWII. A more comprehensive write-up on the VH squadrons can be found in the history of Rescue Squadron 3 (VH-3), which was the US Navy's most active VH squadron. VH-5 rescued 8 air crewman, assisted in the rescue another 2 aviators, and assisted in the capture of 4 Japanese adrift on a raft. VH-5 was established in September 1944 and disestablished in June 1946. The squadron employed the Martin PBM Mariner during its operations.

Operational history 
 September 1944: VH-5 was established at NAS Alameda, California.
 April 1945: VH-5 commences rescue operations headquartered out of Ebeye Island in the Kwajalein Atoll. Detachments are also stationed at Majuro and Enewetak Atoll.
 May 1945: VH-5 rescues 4 survivors from 2 downed SB2C and 1 downed F4U, assists in the rescue of another 2 survivors of a downed SB2C, and assists in the capture of 4 Japanese adrift on a raft. 
 June 1945: VH-5 rescues 2 survivors from a downed SB2C from VMSB-331. 
 July 1945: VH-5 rescues 2 survivors from an SB2C downed after a strike against Wotje Atoll. 
 19-28 August and 5 September 1945: VH-5 participates in the negotiations, formal surrender, and American occupation of Japanese-held Mili Atoll and Jaluit Atoll. 
 June 1946: VH-5 was disestablished.

See also 
 VH-3 (Rescue squadron)
 VH-5 squadron [1]
 VH squadrons [2]
 Dumbo (air-sea rescue)
 Seaplane tender
 Flying boat
 Air-sea rescue
 List of inactive United States Navy aircraft squadrons

References 

Rescue squadrons of the United States Navy